Boletin is a settlement in the municipality of Zveçan, Kosovo.

There is a 14th-century Serbian Orthodox monastery in the village, the Sokolica Monastery.

Isa Boletini, an iconic Albanian nationalist and significant military leader of Albanian independence, was born in the village. He was reburied there on 10 June 2015, nearly a century after his death.

Notable people
 Isa Boletini (1864–1916)

Notes

External links

Villages in Zvečan
Medieval Serbian sites in Kosovo